Table Mountain Observatory (TMO) is an astronomical observation facility operated by NASA's Jet Propulsion Laboratory (California Institute of Technology). It is located in Big Pines, California, in Angeles National Forest near Wrightwood, north-northeast of Los Angeles, California, in the United States.

TMO is part of JPL's Table Mountain Facility (TMF). The larger site hosts a number of non-astronomical projects. The site was first used by the Smithsonian Institution in 1924, which conducted atmospheric, solar, and astronomical observations for many years. JPL took over the lease in 1962. The observatory conducts high-precision astrometric observations to support NASA and international spacecraft mission navigation, confirmation and recovery of near-Earth objects such as comets and asteroids that may potentially impact the Earth, and technology development.

The main-belt asteroid 84882 Table Mountain was named in honor of the observatory.

List of discovered minor planets 

More than 260 minor planets were discovered at TMO, often referred to as "Wrightwood" the Minor Planet Center and credited to several astronomers, most notably to James Young, but also to other astronomers such as Jack B. Child, Greg Fisch, A. Grigsby, D. Mayes, and Mallory Vale. The MPC also directly credits TMO with the discovery of one numbered main-belt asteroid (see table).

Instruments 
Two telescopes are currently operated at TMO:
 The  Pomona College Telescope is a Cassegrain reflector built at Pomona College. It first became operational in 1985, and had new mirrors installed in 1996. 
 A 0.6 m Ritchey-Chrétien reflector built by Astro Mechanics was installed in 1966. It is attached to an off-axis German equatorial mount.

Former instruments 

Former instruments at TMO include:
 A  reflector previously located at Cloudcroft Observatory was acquired in the late 1980s and became operational in the early 1990s. It was removed from the TMO web site before June 2003.
 A  Ritchey-Chrétien reflector built by RC Optical Systems was attached to an equatorial mount. It was installed in 2003 and removed from the TMO web site before July 2011. It was housed in the dome where the Schmidt camera was previously located.
 A  Cassegrain reflector was installed at TMO in 1962. Harvey Mudd College was the main user of this telescope from the 1970s through at least 1991.
 A  Schmidt camera owned by JPL operated at TMO from 1985 until at least 1991.
 A  millimeter wavelength radio antenna was located at TMO from 1970 until at least 1985.

Honours 
The main-belt asteroid 84882 Table Mountain, discovered by James Whitney Young at TMO in 2003, was named in honor of the observatory. Naming citation was published on 28 October 2004.

See also
 Mount Wilson Observatory
 Fundamental station
 List of astronomical observatories
 List of asteroid-discovering observatories

References

External links 
 
 Table Mountain Observatory at the Pomona College astronomy department
 Photographic history of Table Mountain Observatory

Astronomical observatories in California
Angeles National Forest
San Gabriel Mountains
Buildings and structures in San Bernardino County, California
California Institute of Technology buildings and structures
Jet Propulsion Laboratory
Minor-planet discovering observatories
NASA facilities
Natural history of San Bernardino County, California
Wrightwood, California
1924 establishments in California